Pterostylis bicolor, commonly known as the black-tip greenhood, is a plant in the orchid family Orchidaceae and is endemic to south-eastern Australia. It has a rosette of leaves and when flowering, three to ten well-spaced, bright green flowers with a blunt, greenish-black appendage on the labellum. It is similar to the swan orchid, Pterostylis cycnocephala but that species has a beak-like appendage and crowded flowers.

Description
Pterostylis bicolor, is a terrestrial,  perennial, deciduous, herb with an underground tuber. Six to eleven stem leaves are wrapped around the flowering spike. The dorsal sepal and petals form a hood or "galea" over the column. Flowering occurs from August to November.

Taxonomy and naming
Pterostylis bicolor was first formally described in 1987 by David Jones & Mark Clements and the description was published in Proceedings of the Royal Society of Queensland. The specific epithet (bicolor) is a Latin word  meaning "two-coloured".

Distribution and habitat
The black-tip greenhood is widespread in New South Wales and found in scattered populations in Victoria. It grows in grassy woodland and forest.

References

bicolor
Endemic orchids of Australia
Orchids of New South Wales
Orchids of Queensland
Orchids of Victoria (Australia)
Plants described in 1987